ASRC Aerospace Corporation is a subsidiary of Arctic Slope Regional Corporation (ASRC). ASRC Aerospace is an enterprise formed in November 1997. Headquartered in Greenbelt, Maryland, ASRC Aerospace supports 15 major contracts providing a base of over 1000+ personnel. The company's segments are multiple operating units engaging primarily in U.S. Government contracts.

ASRC Aerospace at one time had about 100 projects at NASA Kennedy Space Center. These projects included studies on lightning strikes and how the associated magnetism could affect launch operations for the shuttle fleet. The company also has designed lightning arresters to protect the Ares rocket, which was planned to replace the Space Shuttle prior to the Obama administration's decision to cancel the  Constellation Program
. The company also has completed the analysis and design of a concept for an electrostatic shield to protect a lunar base.

ASRC Aerospace is the prime contractor for the University-Affiliated Spaceport Technology Development Contract (USTDC) to design ground support equipment and develop new technologies. The company has been engaged in designing the new mobile launcher and modifying the launch pads. ASRC has also been involved in other scientific research. The USTDC contract expired on October 31, 2010 and future contracts at Kennedy Space Center remain uncertain, given the agency's direction to abandon the Constellation program as well as the scheduled end of the Space Shuttle Program. ASRC Aerospace has laid-off approximately 20% of its workforce in 2010 on the USTDC contract, including subcontractors.

For its work at NASA KSC and other field centers, Florida Lt. Governor Toni Jennings awarded ASRC Aerospace 2006 Florida Space Business Award  for leadership in innovative approaches to developing breakthrough technologies for space exploration.

The National Aeronautics and Space Administration (NASA) presented the George M. Low award to ASRC Aerospace Corporation on February 26, 2008 in recognition of sustained, high quality performance in launch site design engineering, project management, technology development, and technical support services.

Major Contracts

 University-Affiliated Spaceport Technology Development Contract (USTDC), Kennedy Space Center, FL
 Glenn Engineering and Scientific Services (GESS-2), NASA Glenn Research Center in Cleveland, Ohio
 Several contracts for the Department of Defense
 Information Technology Support Contract for the Department of Energy
 USAF Space and Missile Systems Center (SMC) Technical Assistance Support Services (TASS)
 NASA Space Communications Network Services (SCNS)

References

External links
 Official website
 USTDC
 GESS-2
 Arctic Slope Regional Corporation

Arctic Slope region
Aerospace companies of the United States
Companies based in Prince George's County, Maryland
Greenbelt, Maryland